Rob Burnett may refer to:

 Rob Burnett (American football), a former defensive end who played in the NFL from 1990 to 2003
 Rob Burnett (producer), a producer, director and writer, best known for being the executive producer of Late Show with David Letterman